Glenea celestis is a species of beetle in the family Cerambycidae. It was described by James Thomson in 1865. It contains the varietas Glenea celestis var. margaretae.

References

celestis
Beetles described in 1865